Eilean Mòr is an uninhabited, tidal island opposite Oronsay at the entrance to Loch Sunart, an arm of the sea on the west coast of Scotland. At low tide it is attached to Glenmore on the Ardnamurchan peninsula. At low tide it is attached to Glenmore on the Ardnamurchan peninsula. The water around Eilean Mòr contains flame shells.

References

Uninhabited islands of Highland (council area)
Tidal islands of Scotland
Ardnamurchan